Russia, officially known as the Russian Federation, has competed at the modern Olympic Games on many occasions, but as different nations in its history.  As the Russian Empire, the nation first competed at the 1900 Games, and returned again in 1908 and 1912.  After the Russian revolution in 1917, and the subsequent establishment of the Soviet Union in 1922, it would be thirty years until Russian athletes once again competed at the Olympics, as the Soviet Union at the 1952 Summer Olympics.  After the dissolution of the Soviet Union in 1991, Russia competed as part of the Unified Team in 1992, and finally returned once again as Russia at the 1994 Winter Olympics.

The Russian Olympic Committee was created in 1991 and recognized in 1993. The Soviet Union hosted the 1980 Summer Olympics in Moscow, and the Russian Federation hosted the 2014 Winter Olympics in Sochi.

In six appearances Russian athletes have won a total of 425 medals at the Summer Olympic Games and another 121 at the Winter Olympic Games. Over the most recent twelve Games (since 1994), Russia's 546 total medals, including 195 gold medals, are third behind only the United States and China.

In 2017, Russia was suspended from competing at the Olympic Games due to the state-sponsored doping scandal. Russian athletes were allowed to participate in the 2018 Winter Olympics as the Olympic Athletes from Russia (OAR).  They are also allowed to compete at the 2020 Summer Olympics and the 2022 Winter Olympics, representing the Russian Olympic Committee.

Hosted Games 
Russia has hosted the Games on two occasions. Moscow was the host of the 1980 Summer Games, when Russia (Russian SFSR) was part of the Soviet Union. Sochi was the host of the 2014 Winter Games, as part of the Russian Federation.

Participation

Timeline of participation

Combined medals 
The Russian Federation, the Russian Empire, the Olympic Athletes from Russia and the Russian Olympic Committee (ROC) are sometimes combined outside of IOC sources. The Soviet Union is often combined with the post-union team that competed in 1992. Some sources combine the Soviet Union and Russia, despite the fact that many republics which subsequently gained or re-gained independence (Armenia, Azerbaijan, Belarus, Estonia, Georgia,  Kazakhstan, Kyrgyzstan, Latvia, Lithuania, Moldova, Tajikistan, Turkmenistan, Ukraine and Uzbekistan) contributed to the medal tally of the USSR, and there are sources that combine all medals of RU1, URS, EUN, OAR, ROC and RUS. On 31 January 1992, the United Nations recognized, without objection, Russia as legal successor of the rights and obligations of the former Soviet Union, but this has no significance in medal tallies.

Medal counts:
Russia combined with precursors
status after the 2022 Olympics

Medal tables 

*Purple border colour indicates tournament was held on home soil.

Medals by Summer Games

Medals by Winter Games 

Notes
 1: nominally banned due to the state-sponsored doping program.

Medals by Summer Sports

Medals by Winter Sports

Notes
On 9 February 2014, Russia captured the inaugural gold medal in the team figure skating event at the 2014 Sochi Winter Olympics. Yulia Lipnitskaya, at 15, becomes the youngest Russian Winter Olympic medalist.
On 10 February 2014, Viktor Ahn won the first short track speedskating medal for Russia competing as Russia. He won the bronze medal in the 1500m short track speedskating event at the 2014 Sochi winter Olympics.
On 15 February 2014, Ahn won the second Russian gold medal in the 1000m short track speedskating event, leading the first Russian 1–2 finish in short track, with Vladimir Grigorev winning silver. At 31 years and 191 days, Grigorev also became the oldest man to win a short track Olympic medal.
On 20 February 2014, Adelina Sotnikova won the first ever Russian ladies figure skating gold medal.

Stripped Olympic medals 

Due to doping violations, Russia has been stripped of 45 Olympic medals – the most of any country, four times the number of the runner-up, and 30% of the global total. It was the leading country in terms of the number of medals removed due to doping at the 2002 Winter Olympics (5 medals), the 2006 Winter Olympics (1 medal), the 2008 Summer Olympics (14 medals), the 2012 Summer Olympics (17 medals), 2014 Winter Olympics (4 medals — 10 others were stripped and returned) and the joint most at the 2004 Summer Olympics (3 medals) and the 2016 Summer Olympics (1 medal).

2016-present partial ban 

Russia was partially banned from participation at the 2016 Summer Olympics due to the state-sponsored doping scandal. Russian athletes were then allowed to participate in the 2018 Winter Olympics as the Olympic Athletes from Russia (OAR), and in both the 2020 Summer Olympics and the 2022 Winter Olympics as the Russian Olympic Committee athletes (ROC).

Flag bearers

  – Sergei Tchepikov
  – Aleksandr Karelin
  – Alexey Prokurorov
  – Andrey Lavrov
  – Alexey Prokurorov
  – Alexander Popov
  – Dmitry Dorofeyev
  – Andrei Kirilenko
  – Aleksey Morozov
  – Maria Sharapova
  – Alexander Zubkov
  – Sergey Tetyukhin

See also
 :Category:Olympic competitors for Russia
 Russia at the Paralympics
 Russian Empire at the Olympics
 Soviet Union at the Olympics & Unified Team at the Olympics
 Doping in Russia
 Icarus (2017 film)

References

External links